Vagina Diner is the debut studio album by the American rapper Akinyele, released on Interscope Records in 1993. The album's single was "Ak Ha Ha! Ak Hoo Hoo?" The album did not receive much promotional backing from Interscope, but did manage to become a hit on college radio.

Critical reception
In a retrospective review, Spin wrote that Akinyele is "a gritty, X-rated joker with a uniquely bipolar flow—his set-ups are nimble wordplay, his punchlines are delivered in a low Oscar the Grouch croak."

Track listing
All songs produced by Large Professor.

Personnel
 Akinyele – vocals
 Large Professor – production
 Rob Swift – scratches
 Matt Noble – engineering
 Anton Pushansky – engineering
 Rob Sutton – engineering
 Dino Zervous – engineering
 Tar – photography
 The Pizz – illustration
 Kimberly Holt – art direction, design

Charts

References

External links
 

1993 debut albums
Akinyele (rapper) albums
Interscope Records albums
Albums produced by Large Professor